Her Best Move is a 2007 teen romantic comedy film directed by Norm Hunter. It tells the story of a 17–19-year-old soccer prodigy named Sara Davis who has a chance to join the U.S. National Team. At the same time, she must juggle high school, romance, sports, and parental pressure.

Plot
Sara Davis (Leah Pipes), a 17-19-year-old female soccer prodigy, has a chance to join the U.S. National Soccer Team. Her daily life is extremely hectic, as she finds a balance between high school, running, romance, sports, and parental pressure while realizing her own priorities. Sara, coached by her father Gil (Scott Patterson), sacrifices her interest in dance, photography, and her social life to concentrate on her sport.

With the encouragement of her best friend Tutti (Lalaine), Sara begins a relationship with Josh (Drew Tyler Bell), the solitary photographer on the school newspaper. As she takes control of her life, Sara faces the challenge of discovering what she really wants, so that she can make the best move of her life.

Cast
 Leah Pipes as Sara Davis 
 Scott Patterson as Gil Davis 
 Lisa Darr as Julia
 Drew Tyler Bell as Josh
 Lalaine as Tutti
 Daryl Sabara as Doogie
 Jhoanna Flores as Regina
 Denise Dowse as Lisa
 Fay Masterson as Lori
 Brandi Chastain as herself

References

External links

2007 films
2007 in women's association football
2007 romantic comedy films
2000s teen comedy films
20th Century Fox direct-to-video films
American romantic comedy films
American teen comedy films
Metro-Goldwyn-Mayer direct-to-video films
Women's association football films
American association football films
2007 directorial debut films
2000s English-language films
2007 direct-to-video films
2000s American films